The Holy Spirit Seminary is the seminary which is affiliated with the Roman Catholic Diocese of Hong Kong. Since its foundation in 1931 as the "Regional Seminary for South China", it has provided theological and pastoral formation to young men who aspire to serve the Church as diocesan priests.

Its Seminary College also provides courses in theology and philosophy for lay students.

History
The seminary descends from the "Regional Seminary for South China", which was transferred to the Diocese of Hong Kong in 1964 as China no longer sent seminarians at that point. The Jesuits, Salesians and Franciscans have been involved in it.

On Saturday, 22 September 2012, Pope Benedict XVI named Professor Anna Kai-Yung Chan, a Professor at Holy Spirit Seminary's College of Theology and Philosophy, as one of the papally-appointed Experts to serve at the upcoming October 2012 13th Ordinary General Assembly of the Synod of Bishops on the New Evangelization.

References

External links

Holy Spirit Seminary website 
Holy Spirit Study Centre website

Catholic universities and colleges in Hong Kong
Catholic organizations established in the 20th century
Catholic seminaries
Educational institutions established in 1964
Seminaries and theological colleges in Hong Kong
1964 establishments in Hong Kong